Edward Seale can refer to:

 Edward Seale (Australian cricketer) (1859–1927), Australian cricketer
 Edward Seale (English cricketer) (1811–1893), English cricketer